The United Soccer Association was a professional soccer league featuring teams based in the United States and Canada. The league survived only one season before merging with the National Professional Soccer League to form the North American Soccer League. Every team in the league was actually an imported European or South America club, that was then outfitted with a "local" name. Dick Walsh served as the commissioner.

Origins
In 1966 a group of sports entrepreneurs, led by Jack Kent Cooke and including Lamar Hunt and Steve Stavro, formed a consortium known as the North American Soccer League with the intention of forming a professional soccer league in North America. This group was subsequently sanctioned by both the USSFA and FIFA. However a rival consortium known as the National Professional Soccer League also emerged and to avoid confusion Cooke renamed his consortium the United Soccer Association. The USA originally intended to launch its league in the spring of 1968. However the NPSL, which secured a TV contract from CBS, announced it was ready to launch in 1967. Not wanting to lose ground to its rival, the USA decided to fast track its launch. Without any players of its own, it opted to import whole teams from Europe and South America. It was intended that these teams would represent the franchises during the inaugural season, giving them time to build their own squads for the following season. By May 1967, the USA had garnered applications for franchises wanting to create teams for the next season. An application was made for a team in Miami, to be called the Miami Cobras. A Calgary-based franchise was also in the offing.

Competing teams

1967 season
After a series of exhibition games, the USA began playing on May 28 and got off to a good start. The Houston Stars attracted an opening crowd of 34,965. However subsequent attendances did not keep pace and the league finished with an average of 7,890 per game. Of the twelve teams, the Los Angeles Wolves, represented by Wolverhampton Wanderers and featuring Derek Dougan, the Cleveland Stokers, represented by Stoke City and featuring Gordon Banks, and the Washington Whips, represented by Aberdeen, emerged as the strongest sides. Roberto Boninsegna of Chicago Mustangs finished as the league's top scorer with 10 goals.

The USA entered its playoff stage in July 1967. The Western Division champion Los Angeles Wolves, by the flip of a coin, won the right to host the championship game against the Eastern Division champion Washington Whips. The match drew 17,824 to Los Angeles Memorial Coliseum. The Wolves won the championship beating the Whips, 6-5, after 36 minutes of extra-time. The wide-open final featured two hat-tricks, three penalties given (two converted), four goals scored within a four-minute period midway through the second half and each team scoring during (non-golden goal) extra time. The game was finally decided when Whips defender Ally Shewan scored an own goal shortly after the start of golden goal extra time.

Final standings

Eastern Division

Western Division

USA Final 1967

1967 USA Champions: Los Angeles Wolves

USA All-Stars

Coach of the year
Ronnie Allen, Los Angeles

NASL
In December 1967 the USA merged with National Professional Soccer League to form the North American Soccer League, taking the original name of the USA group. As a result of the merger several of the original USA franchises folded. This was partly to avoid some cities having two teams. As a result, Toronto City, New York Skyliners and the San Francisco Golden Gate Gales were disbanded in favor of their NPSL rivals, Toronto Falcons, New York Generals and Oakland Clippers. The owners of the Gales franchise subsequently merged with the Vancouver Royal Canadians and the Boston Rovers were relaunched as the Boston Beacons. Together with the Cleveland Stokers, Los Angeles Wolves, Houston Stars, Washington Whips and Dallas Tornado, these teams then became founding members of the NASL. However, after the 1968 season all of these franchises, with the exception of Dallas folded. For their part, the Tornado went on to become NASL champions in 1971 and continued to play in the NASL until 1981, when they merged with the Tampa Bay Rowdies.

The idea of importing teams to represent franchises was revived during the 1969 NASL season. Both Wolverhampton Wanderers and Dundee United returned. This time the former represented Kansas City Spurs and again emerged as champions. The latter linked up once again with Dallas Tornado. Two other English League teams West Ham United and Aston Villa represented Baltimore Bays and Atlanta Chiefs while  Kilmarnock of the Scottish Football League played as the St. Louis Stars.

Attendance

Sources: kenn.com

References

General
 Official 1968 North American Soccer League Guide. St. Louis: The Sporting News, 1968.
 Durso, Joseph. "Local Pro Soccer Teams May Share Stadium With Yanks in Spring," The New York Times, Sunday, February 12, 1967.

Specific

External links
 The year in American soccer - 1967 by Steve Holroyd on Sover.net (archived, 10 Oct 1999)

 
North American Soccer League (1968–1984)
Sports leagues established in 1967
Defunct soccer leagues in the United States
Defunct soccer leagues in Canada
International club association football competitions hosted by the United States
1
1967 in Canadian soccer
Sports leagues disestablished in 1967